F. juncea may refer to:

 Freesia juncea, a southeastern African plant
 Froelichia juncea, a plant native to the Galápagos Islands